Elmina, also known as Edina by the local Fante, is a town and the capital of the Komenda/Edina/Eguafo/Abirem District on the south coast of Ghana in the Central Region, situated on a bay on the Atlantic Ocean,  west of Cape Coast. Elmina was the first European settlement in West Africa and it has a population of 33,576 people.

History

Prior to the arrival of the Portuguese, the town was called Anomansah ("perpetual" or "inexhaustible drink") from its position on the peninsula between the Benya lagoon and the sea.

In 1478 (during the War of the Castilian Succession), a Castilian armada of 35 caravels and a Portuguese fleet fought a large naval battle near Elmina for the control of the Guinea trade (gold, slaves, ivory and melegueta pepper), the Battle of Guinea. The war ended with a Portuguese naval victory, followed by the official recognition by the Catholic Monarchs of Portuguese sovereignty over most of the West African territories in dispute embodied in the Treaty of Alcáçovas, 1479. This was the first colonial war among European powers. Many more would come.

The town grew around São Jorge da Mina Castle, built by the Portuguese Diogo de Azambuja in 1482 on the site of a town or village called Amankwakurom or Amankwa. It was Portugal's West African headquarters for trade and exploitation of African wealth. The original Portuguese interest was gold, with 8,000 ounces shipped to Lisbon from 1487 to 1489, 22,500 ounces from 1494 to 1496, and 26,000 ounces by the start of the sixteenth century.

Later the port expanded to include tens of thousands of slaves channeled through the trading post of Elmina, ten to twelve thousand from 1500 to 1535 alone.  By 1479, the Portuguese were transporting slaves from as far away as Benin, who accounted for 10 percent of the trade in Elmina, and were used to clear land for tillage.

The location of Elmina made it a significant site for re-provisioning ships headed south towards the Cape of Good Hope on their way to India. After years of Portuguese commerce on the Elmina Coast, the Dutch learned of the profitable activity taking place through Barent Eriksz of Medemblik, one of the earliest traders and Guinea navigators. Ericksz learned about trading on the Elmina coast while he was a prisoner on Principe and subsequently became a major resource to the Dutch in terms of providing geographical and trading information. The Dutch West India Company captured Elmina in 1637; in subsequent centuries it was mostly used as a hub for the slave trade. The British attacked the city in 1782, but it remained in Dutch hands until 1872, when the Dutch Gold Coast was sold to the British. The king of Ashanti, claiming to be suzerain, objected to the transfer, and initiated the third Anglo-Ashanti war of 1873–1874.

Elmina is also home to Fort Coenraadsburg on St. Jago Hill, built by the Portuguese in 1555 under the name Forte de Santiago; it was used for commerce. In 1637 it was conquered and renamed by the Dutch, after they captured Elmina's main castle. Today, Elmina's main economic industry is fishing, salt production and tourism. Elmina Castle is very close to Cape Coast Castle, another historic fortress notable for its role in transatlantic slave trade.

Economy

Beginning in 2003, Elmina, along with foreign investors, began The Elmina Strategy 2015, a massive project to improve many aspects of the town, consisting of water drainage and waste management helping to improve the health of the citizens, repairing the fishing industry and harbour of within Elmina, tourism and economic development, improved health services, and improved educational services.

Climate

Tourism
Apart from Elmina Castle and Fort Coenraadsburg, the main tourist attractions in Elmina include the Dutch Cemetery and the Elmina Java Museum.

Sister cities
List of sister cities of Elmina, designated by Sister Cities International:

Festival
Elmina is home to the annual Bakatue Festival, a celebration of the sea and the local fishing culture, held on the first Tuesday of July each year.

Bakatue translated means "the opening of the lagoon" or the "draining of the Lagoon". It is celebrated to commemorate the founding of the town, Elmina by the Europeans. It is also celebrated to invoke the deity, Nana Benya's continuous protection of the state and its people.

Notable institution 

 Benya FM

Gallery

See also
 Elmina Castle

References

Citations

Bibliography
 Diffie, Bailey W., and George D. Winius,  Foundations of the Portuguese Empire, 1415-1580, Volume 1, University of Minnesota Press, 1977. 
 Newitt, Malyn,  A History of Portuguese Overseas Expansion, 1400-1668, Routledge, New York, 2005.

External links

 Ghana-pedia website - Elmina
 Elmina Site Page from Aluka Digital Library
  Elminaheritage.com

 
Former Portuguese colonies
Populated places in the Central Region (Ghana)